Baflo (abbreviation: Bf) is a railway station located in Baflo, Netherlands. The station was opened on 16 August 1893 and is located on the Sauwerd–Roodeschool railway. The station is operated by Arriva.

Train service
The following services currently call at Baflo:
2x per hour local service (stoptrein) Groningen - Roodeschool

References

External links 
 
 Baflo station, station information

Transport in Het Hogeland
Railway stations in Groningen (province)
Railway stations on the Hogelandspoor
Railway stations opened in 1893